Avrum Stroll (February 15, 1921 – September 12, 2013) was a research professor at the University of California, San Diego. Born in Oakland, California, he was a distinguished philosopher and a noted scholar in the fields of epistemology, philosophy of language, and twentieth-century analytic philosophy.

Publications

Books
 The Emotive Theory of Ethics. University of California Press, 1954
 Introduction to philosophy. Holt, Rinehart and Winston, 1961 (1972, 1979)
 Epistemology. Harper & Row, 1967 (Greenwood Press, 1979)
 Philosophy and the Human Spirit. Holt, Rinehart and Winston, 1973
 Philosophy and Contemporary Problems. Richard H. Popkin, Avrum Stroll, Holt Rinehart & Winston, February 1984
 Surfaces. University of Minnesota Press, 1988
 Philosophy Made Simple by Richard H. Popkin, Avrum Stroll, Made Simple Books, September 8, 1986 (1993), Paperback
 Moore and Wittgenstein on Certainty. Oxford University Press, 1994
 Introductory Readings In Philosophy.  Avrum Stroll, Richard H. Popkin. Harcourt Brace* Co, November 1997
 Skeptical Philosophy for Everyone. Richard H. Popkin, Avrum Stroll. Prometheus Books, January 2002, Hardcover
 Wittgenstein (Oneworld Philosophers). Oneworld Publications, July 2002 (2007)
 Did My Genes Make Me Do It? Oneworld Publications, August 25, 2004, Hardcover
 Sketches of Landscapes. The MIT Press, December 5, 1997, Hardcover
 Twentieth-Century Analytic Philosophy. Columbia University Press, September 15, 2001, Paperback
 Philosophy. Richard H. Popkin, Avrum Stroll
 Much Ado about Nonexistence. A.P. Martinich, Avrum Stroll. Rowman & Littlefield Publishers, Inc., June 28, 2007 Hardcover
 Informal philosophy. Rowman & Littlefield Publishers, 2009

Articles
 Proper Names, Names, and Fictive Objects, The Journal of Philosophy, Vol. 95, No. 10 (Oct., 1998), pp. 522–534
Wittgenstein and the Dream Hypothesis. Philosophia 37 (4)

References

Analytic philosophers
University of California, San Diego faculty
1921 births
Philosophers of language
Epistemologists
20th-century American philosophers
21st-century American philosophers
2013 deaths